"Just as I Am" is song recorded by American country music artist Ricky Van Shelton.  It was released in March 1993 as the third single from his Greatest Hits Plus compilation album.  The song reached #26 on the Billboard Hot Country Singles & Tracks chart.  The song was written by Larry Boone and Paul Nelson.

Chart performance

References

1993 singles
1992 songs
Ricky Van Shelton songs
Songs written by Larry Boone
Songs written by Paul Nelson (songwriter)
Song recordings produced by Steve Buckingham (record producer)
Columbia Records singles